Test Pattern may refer to:
 Test Pattern (TV series), a Canadian game show
 Test Pattern (album), an album by Sonia Dada
 Test pattern or test card,  a television test signal
 Test Pattern (film), a 2019 film written and directed by Shatara Michelle Ford